David L. Brewer (born May 19, 1946) is a retired vice admiral of the United States Navy and former superintendent of the Los Angeles Unified School District. As Vice Chief of Naval Education and Training, he is known for helping to develop the Navy College Program and negotiating contracts with 11 colleges, universities and community colleges to provide bachelor and associate degree programs to more than 300,000 sailors. He is also known for leading the Military Sealift Command's disaster relief efforts after Hurricane Katrina.

His flag command posts included Commander Naval Forces Marianas, which had the concurrent posts of Commander in Chief U.S. Pacific Command Representative Guam/Commonwealth of the Northern Marianas Islands/Federated States of Micronesia/Republic of Palau. In January 1997, Vice Adm. Brewer took command of Amphibious Group 3 in San Diego, California. In July 1997, he was nominated for promotion to the rank of Rear Adm. (Upper Half). He later became Vice Chief of Naval Education and Training in Pensacola, Florida, and Commander, Military Sealift Command headquartered in Washington, D.C.

Early life
David was born to David L. Brewer, Jr., and Mildred S. Brewer in Farmville, Prince Edward County, Virginia. His naval career began in 1970 when he was commissioned an ensign in the U.S. Navy by former Secretary of the Navy, Senator John Chafee. He was a member of the first graduating class of the first Naval Reserve Officer Training Corps unit at an historically black university, Prairie View A&M University, Prairie View, Texas.

At age five, Brewer moved with his family from Farmville, Virginia to Florida, and he attended elementary and secondary schools in Orlando, Florida. Later, he earned a Bachelor of Science in biology at Prairie View A&M University where he also was a member of the Naval Reserve Officer Training Corps (NROTC). He later earned a Masters of Arts in National Security and Strategic Studies at the Naval War College in Newport, Rhode Island.

Post-navy career

In October 2006, Brewer was unanimously selected by the Los Angeles Board of Education as the superintendent of the Los Angeles Unified School District, (LAUSD).  Brewer succeeded former Colorado Governor Roy Romer as the superintendent. LAUSD is the second largest school district in the U.S., with over 700,000 students, 800 schools, 77,000 employees, and a $7.5 billion budget. He was awarded a four-year contract that took effect November 13, 2006.

Brewer served as superintendent until December 2008 when his contract was bought out by the district prior to the end of his four-year term.  According to figures reported on August 4, 2009, the dropout rate in the Los Angeles Unified School District declined almost 17% under Brewer's leadership. Specifically the dropout rate for the 2007–08 school year came in at 26.4%, down from 31.7% for the previous year and among the largest improvements in the state of California. The Los Angeles Unified School District still trails all other large urban school systems in California except the Oakland Unified School District.

These results highlight the achievements of Brewer, who was forced out in December 2008 despite rising test scores. Brewer, reached by the Los Angeles Times, credited Debra Duardo, a onetime dropout who began the district's dropout-prevention unit, as well as district principals and teachers who accepted responsibility for taking on the dropout problem.

Brewer heads The David and Mildred Brewer Foundation, a family foundation that provides scholarships for African American students. It is named in honor of his mother, a retired school teacher, and his late father, who taught at Brewer's high school for more than 33 years. Brewer currently serves as a Benchmark Practitioner with Benchmarking Partners in Cambridge, Massachusetts.

Personal life
He is married to Richardene "Deanie" Brewer, Ed.D. Dr. Brewer is a graduate of Hampton University where she majored in English education. She also has a Master of Arts degree in curriculum and instruction from San Diego State University. Deanie received her Ed.D. in educational leadership from the University of West Florida in Pensacola, Florida. Dr. Brewer's teaching career has spanned more than 20 years and has taken her from Virginia to San Diego and from England to Guam. She has taught at the middle school, high school and collegiate levels, earning several teacher excellence and academic awards.

Their daughter, Stacey, graduated from Hampton University in 2002 as a distinguished scholar. She went on to receive her Juris Doctor degree from Pennsylvania State's Dickinson School of Law in 2005. She currently resides in Centreville, Virginia.

Decorations

His decorations and awards include the Navy Distinguished Service Medal, Defense Superior Service Medal, Legions of Merit (three), Meritorious Service Medal, Navy and Marine Corps Achievement Medal, Naval War College Distinguished Graduate Leadership Award, Navy League of the United States Vincent T. Hirsch Maritime Award, and the National Defense Transportation Association's Department of Defense Distinguished Service Award.
   Navy Distinguished Service Medal
   Defense Superior Service Medal
   Legion of Merit with two Gold Stars
   Meritorious Service Medal
   Navy and Marine Corps Achievement Medal
   Joint Meritorious Unit Award
   Navy E Ribbon
   Navy Expeditionary Medal
   National Defense Service Medal
   Humanitarian Service Medal
   Navy and Marine Corps Sea Service Deployment Ribbon
   Navy and Marine Corps Overseas Service Ribbon

References

External links

 Biography on David L. Brewer, III 
 U.S. Naval Education and Training Command 

1946 births
Living people
Los Angeles Unified School District superintendents
Recipients of the Legion of Merit
United States Navy vice admirals
Prairie View A&M University alumni
Jones High School (Orlando, Florida) alumni
Naval War College alumni
African-American United States Navy personnel
People from Farmville, Virginia
People from Centreville, Virginia
Recipients of the Navy Distinguished Service Medal
Recipients of the Defense Superior Service Medal
Recipients of the Meritorious Service Medal (United States)
21st-century African-American people
20th-century African-American people